Tenmile Creek is a stream in the U.S. state of Washington. It is a tributary of the Nooksack River.

See also
List of rivers of Washington

References

Rivers of Whatcom County, Washington
Rivers of Washington (state)